USS Conserver (ARS-39) was a  acquired by the U.S. Navy during World War II. Her task was to come to the aid of stricken vessels.

Conserver was launched 27 January 1945 by Basalt Rock Company in Napa, California; sponsored by Mrs. H. Price; and commissioned 9 June 1945 at South Vallejo, California.

End-of-World War II operations 
 
Conserver arrived at Sasebo, Japan, 21 September 1945, and until 3 March 1946, she carried out salvage operations at Sasebo, Okinawa, Yokosuka, Aomori, and Hakodate in support of the occupation.

Participation in nuclear testing 

After preparations at Pearl Harbor, Conserver arrived at Bikini Atoll 29 March. She served in the Marshall Islands, aiding in Operation Crossroads, the atomic weapons tests of 1946, until 2 September 1947, when she arrived at Manila for duty in the Philippines. From 9 April 1948 to 26 September, she served in Hawaiian waters, and then in Alaskan waters, returning to Pearl Harbor 13 January 1949.

Korean War era operations 
 
From Pearl Harbor, Conserver returned to operate off Alaska between 14 April 1949 and 7 June, and from 10 December to 25 March 1950. With the outbreak of the Korean war, she arrived at Yokosuka 15 July, and between 15 July and 1 August carried out salvage and diving assignments in Korean waters. After a brief overhaul at Yokosuka, she salvaged a fuel pipeline at Iwo Jima, and from 10 September until 24 December returned to Korean waters.

After a final towing voyage from Japan to Korea in January 1951, Conserver returned to local operations at Pearl Harbor from 16 February to 28 May. After salvage duty at Kwajalein and Majuro, she returned to Pearl Harbor to prepare for her second tour of duty in the Korean War. She arrived at Sasebo 27 September, and operated primarily in Korean waters until 7 May 1952, when she cleared for San Diego, California.
 
After operating on the U.S. West Coast until 4 August 1952, Conserver sailed for brief duty at Pearl Harbor, Kwajalein, Guam, Subic Bay, Bangkok, Singapore, and Sangley Point, returning to Pearl Harbor 22 October. On 6 April 1953, she returned to Sasebo for duty in Korean waters until 9 November, when she cleared for Pearl Harbor.

Post-Korean War activity 
 
From the close of the Korean war through 1960, Conserver alternated operations in the Hawaiian Islands with occasional towing and salvage duty in Pacific islands and tours of duty in the Far East in 1954, 1955, 1955–56, 1957, 1958–59, 1959, and 1960.

Between 20 September 1958 and 20 October, she gave salvage and towing service off Taiwan as American ships stood by during the Quemoy Crisis.

The Conserver participated in Operation Dominic between 25 April - 11 July 11, 1962 as a part of West Pac which involved nuclear testing near Christmas Island.

The Conserver also saw duty as part of Task Force 71 of the US Seventh Fleet in search of Korean Air Lines Flight 007 shot down by the Soviets off Sakhalin Island on 1 Sept. 1983.

LCDR Joseph Sensi jr. served as commanding officer for her last two years of service.

Former Florida State Senator Richard Renick and comedian Ron White served on Conserver during their naval service.

Decommissioning 

Conserver was decommissioned twice. Her first decommissioning occurred on 30 September 1986. She was re-commissioned one year later on 30 September 1987. Her final decommissioning took place on 1 April 1994. She was struck from the Naval Register 1 April 1994 and laid up in the Inactive Ship Maintenance Facility, Pearl Harbor, Hawaii.  Final Disposition, Conserver was sunk as a SINKEX target on or about 13 November 2004 in the Hawaii area.

Chronology

Operation Dominic Chronology

Military awards and honors 

USS Conserver was assigned to Occupation and China service in the Far East:

Conserver received nine battle stars for Korean war service:

She received the following campaign stars for the Vietnam War:

Her crew was eligible for the following medals, ribbons, and commendations:
 Secretary of the Navy Letter of Commendation
 Navy Meritorious Unit Commendation
 Navy Battle "E" Ribbon (4)
 China Service Medal
 American Campaign Medal
 Asiatic-Pacific Campaign Medal
 World War II Victory Medal
 Navy Occupation Service Medal (with Asia clasp)
 National Defense Service Medal (2)
 Korean Service Medal (8)
 Armed Forces Expeditionary Medal (Taiwan Straits)
 Vietnam Service Medal (6)
 Sea Service Deployment Ribbon
 Republic of Vietnam Gallantry Cross Unit Citation
 United Nations Service Medal
 Republic of Vietnam Campaign Medal
 Republic of Korea War Service Medal (retroactive)

Health Effects
Asbestos was used in the construction of the USS Conserver. Those who served aboard her before her 1986-1987 overhaul and recommissioning may have been exposed to asbestos. Sailors who participated in Operation Crossroads or Operation Dominic while aboard the Conserver may have been exposed to radiation related to nuclear bomb testing.

References

External links 
 
Company Shipbuilding History
 http://www.usscurrent.com/rescuesalvage/images/basalt%20one.pdf 
 
  http://wordpress.napahistory.org/wordpress/shipyard-acres-by-pat-renait/ 
 hullnumber.com History of USS Conserver
 USSCONSERVER.ORG
 NAVYSITE.DE
 OPERATION DOMINIC 1
 OPERATION CROSSROADS
 NAVSOURCE.ORG

 

Bolster-class rescue and salvage ships
Ships built in Napa, California
1945 ships
World War II auxiliary ships of the United States
Korean War auxiliary ships of the United States
Vietnam War auxiliary ships of the United States
Cold War auxiliary ships of the United States